Doctor Robert A. Wittenmyer is an American-Born in Australian astrophysicist and astronomer. He has led the team of researchers who discovered the exoplanet Gliese 832 c.

He is the leader of a collaboration between Australian, Chinese, and the US exoplanet search team and also a member of the Anglo-Australian Planet Search.
He is currently employed by the University of Southern Queensland located in Toowoomba, Queensland, Australia as an Associate Professor.

Discoveries
 Nu2 Canis Majoris b 
 HD 159868 c 
 Gliese 832 c

References 

21st-century Australian astronomers
Australian astrophysicists
Living people
Place of birth missing (living people)
1976 births